is a Japanese near-future action manga series written and illustrated by Yumi Tamura. It was serialized in Shogakukan's Bessatsu Shōjo Comic magazine from the November 2000 issue (released in October) to the May 2001 issue (released in April). Shogakukan collected the individual chapters into two bound volumes published under the Flower Comics imprint. Viz Media licensed the manga for an English-language release in North America, first serialized in Animerica Extra magazine and later published in graphic novel format.

Overview
It is the middle of the 21st century and Tokyo is expanding more and more, filling the ground of Tokyo Bay with landfills to make room for the bursting population. But suddenly, Tokyo suffers its greatest earthquake since the first quarter of the 20th century, and the landfill liquefies, creating untold damage in the newly made urban area. It is there that the members of Self-Defense Force Rescue Squad Four are sent, to locate survivors and assist in any way possible. But what they dig up is a plot of murder and destruction—one that wipes out nearly the entire squad and leaves its two surviving members, the fierce tomboy Rei and her cool, handsome partner Uozumi, in a fight for their lives well after the rubble from the quake has been cleaned up. There is only one place where they can find the work that keeps them alive, and the support so they can start uncovering the mystery that killed their squad: that's in the south-Shinjuku bar called Chicago.

Rescues Inc.
Rescue workers Rei and her handsome partner Uozumi are looking for survivors after Tokyo's worst earthquake of the 21st century. But their efforts uncover man-made violence, and they are suddenly attacked and their entire squad murdered. Some secret plot is lurking in the ruins of Tokyo Bay District D, and to find it, Rei and Uozumi must join a privately funded hostage rescue organization run out of a Tokyo bar called Chicago. Now, Rei saves the lives of others while she searches for her own salvation.

Characters

Squad Four
 
 A tomboyish woman who worked for the Rescue Inc. After their partners are murdered, Uozumi is taken to jail.
 
 Partner of Rei.
 
 Uozumi's boyfriend

Chicago Bar
 
 A handsome recruit of Chicago Bar who works with Rei and Uozumi in their first mission. He and Rei seem to have romantic feelings.
 
 Boss of Jacky's Chicago Bar.
 Scout
 He's the man who takes Rei and Uozumi to the Chicago Bar.
 
 A big guy who also is the recruit of Chicago.
 
 A bald scientist who seems weird. He invents special things.

Mission Hostage
 
 A boy who was mistaken for Alto, his friend, and was kidnapped under his name by the bandits. He dreams of being a journalist. When he is saved by Rei, he thinks she's a cop and gets a mini-camera to her uniform. Afterward, she returns it to him and tells him not to peep.
 Alto Dejoji
 Son of a millionaire. He and Billy belong to the same club and are in the same photo. It is for this reason that Billy was mistaken for him.

Volumes

Reception
In a column for Anime News Network, writer and cartoonist Shaenon K. Garrity listed Chicago as one of her favorite "badass"  (girls') manga series; she stated that "virtually every page [of Chicago] contains something more incredibly hardcore than you have ever seen from characters with giant sparkly  eyes and even more ginormous  hair."

References

External links
 

2000 manga
Drama anime and manga
Psychological anime and manga
Science fiction anime and manga
Shogakukan manga
Shōjo manga
Viz Media manga